= Ralph Nurnberger =

Ralph Nurnberger is a professor at Georgetown University, teaching international relations, and former legislative liaison with the American Israel Public Affairs Committee.

In 1994, Nurnberger assisted in the creation of the India Abroad Center for Political Awareness, which helped strengthen US and Israeli counter terrorism training in India. He remains an associate of the group.
